The Ronald Fisher bibliography contains the works published by the English statistician and biologist Ronald Fisher (1890–1962).

Books 
 
 
 
 (with Frank Yates)

Book chapters

Collections

Journal articles 

1910s
 
 
 
 
 
 (with CS Stock) 
 
 
 

1920s
 
 
 
 
 
 
 
 
 
 
 
 (with WA Mackenzie) 
 (with HG Thornton and WA Mackenzie) 
 
 
 
 (with WA Mackenzie) 
 
 
 
 
 
 
 
 ( with S Odén) 
 
 
 
 (with PR Ansell) 
 
 
 
 
 
 
 
 
 (with J Wishart) 
 (with T Eden) 
 (with HG Thornton) 
 
 
 
 
 
 
 (with LHC Tippett) 
 
 
 (with TN Hoblyn) 
 
 
 
 
 
 (with T Eden) 
 

1930s
 
 
 
 
 
 (with J Wishart) 
 
 
 
 
 (with S Bartlett) 
 
 
 
 (with FR Immer and O Tedlin) 
 
 
 
 
 
 
 
 
 
 
 
 
 (with F Yates) 
 
 
 
 
 
 
 
 
 
 
 
 
 
 
 
 (with DMS Watson, NW Timofeeff-Ressovsky, EJ Salisbury, WB Turrill, TJ Jenkin, RR Gates et al) 
 
 (with S Barbacki) 
 
 
 
 
 (with EA Cornish) 
 (with B Day) 
 
 
 
 
 
 
 
 
 
 
 
 (with EB Ford and J Huxley) 

1940s
 
 
 
 
 (with GL Taylor) 
 
 
 
 
 
 
 
 
 
 (with WRG Atkins) 
 
 
 
 
 
 
 
 
 
 
 
 
 
 
 
 
 
 
 
 
 
 
 
 
 
 

1950s
 
 
 
 
 
 
 
 
 
 
 
 
 
 
 
 
 
 
 
 
 
 
 
 
 
 
 
 
 
 
 
 
 

1960s
 
 
 (with EA Cornish)

References 
 
 
 
 

Bibliographies of English writers
English eugenicists
English geneticists
English mathematicians
English statisticians
Evolutionary biologists
Rothamsted statisticians
Science bibliographies